Arbostola is a genus of moths of the family Noctuidae.

Species
Arbostola adrana Druce, 1889
Arbostola heuritica Dyar, 1921
Arbostola viridis Druce, 1900

References
Natural History Museum Lepidoptera genus database

Catocalinae